Seppi can be either an Italian family name, or an affectionate abbreviation for the name Joseph or Josef, commonly used in Swiss German.

People with the family name Seppi:
Andreas Seppi - Italian tennis player
Donato Seppi - leader of the Italian nationalist political party Unitalia
People with the given name, or referred to as Seppi:
Seppi DuMoulin - Canadian Football League player of the early 20th century
Seppi Hurschler - Swiss Nordic skiing competitor
Josef Ritler - Swiss journalist
Jo Siffert - Swiss motor racing driver of the 1960s and '70s